Hoffman Peak is a peak rising to  north-northeast of Mount McLennan in the Asgard Range of Victoria Land, Antarctica. It was named by the New Zealand Geographic Board (1998) after J.H. (Jack) Hoffman, a drilling specialist who helped establish the New Zealand Scott Base and erect its various antennae.

References

Mountains of the Asgard Range
Scott Coast